The Honourable Schoolboy (1977) is a spy novel by British writer John le Carré. George Smiley must reconstruct an intelligence service in order to run a successful offensive espionage operation to save the service from being dismantled by the government. In 1977, the book won the Gold Dagger award for the best crime novel of the year and the James Tait Black Memorial Prize. The Honourable Schoolboy is the second novel in the omnibus titled either Smiley Versus Karla or The Quest for Karla.

Chronology
This is the sixth le Carré spy novel featuring George Smiley. Tinker Tailor Soldier Spy, The Honourable Schoolboy  and Smiley's People were later published as an omnibus edition titled Smiley Versus Karla in 1982.

Plot
In 1974 George Smiley, the chief of the British secret intelligence service referred to as The Circus, is repairing the damage done to their operations by double agent Bill Haydon and looking for opportunities to target Karla, the Moscow Centre spymaster. Smiley and analysts Connie Sachs and Doc di Salis look into investigations suppressed by the outed mole and find that a historic investigation of a money laundering operation in Laos by Sam Collins could indicate a Moscow intelligence operation.

Smiley dispatches Jerry Westerby, a newspaper reporter and occasional Circus operative, to Hong Kong under the guise of a sports journalist. Westerby traces the Soviet money to Drake Ko, a local businessman with links to both the criminal underworld and the British establishment. London establishes that Drake Ko has a brother, Nelson, who is a high-ranking Chinese official and who has been spying on the Chinese for the Soviets.

Westerby, following up leads provided by London, interviews Drake's English mistress Lizzie Worthington and discovers that Drake has been attempting to set up an illicit air route into China. Charlie Marshall and Tiny Ricardo (both pilots and smugglers) were approached by Drake to carry opium into China, and return with a package. The flights were never completed, and Smiley surmises that the package was Nelson, who wished to defect from China. The money supplied by Moscow was intended for Nelson, to be accessed after he left China.

Nelson would be a prime intelligence source on both Soviet and Chinese capabilities, but political maneuverings between London and Washington hamper the investigation. It is finally agreed that the Circus will run the operation to capture Nelson and interrogate him afterwards, with all information shared with the United States. Smiley instructs Westerby to become more proactive in his investigations, forcing Drake to move forward with his plans to extract Nelson. The banker from whom Westerby had acquired Ko's identity, Frost, is brutally murdered, and Westerby and his Hong Kong colleague Luke are shown the mutilated body. Concerned for his safety, Westerby travels in and out of war-torn Cambodia, Vietnam, and Thailand, where Ricardo tries to kill Westerby. On his return to Hong Kong, Westerby finds Luke murdered in his apartment. Westerby becomes increasingly stressed and begins to obsess over Worthington's situation, the ethics of the operation, and Western involvement in Asia.

Sam Collins has blackmailed Worthington into bugging and informing on Drake. The Circus now has enough information to predict Drake's plan, which replicates his own escape from China via sea. Westerby is ordered to return to London. Westerby ignores this and contacts Worthington to warn her of the danger she is in. Smiley along with Circus and CIA operatives arrive in Hong Kong to oversee the final stages of the operation. Smiley and his men encounter Westerby and try to force him to board a plane but Westerby escapes and with Worthington's help, reaches the rendezvous point where Drake intends to meet his brother. Westerby warns Drake of the plans of the intelligence agencies in an effort to protect Worthington from reprisal and to have an opportunity to be with her, but Drake does not heed his warning. At their appointed meeting place on the beach, CIA forces seize Nelson, and Westerby is killed by Fawn, a Circus operative. 

In the aftermath, the CIA detains and interrogates Nelson, freezing the Circus out. The success of the operation yields top Circus jobs for Enderby, who becomes Chief, and Collins, who becomes Head of Operations. Smiley and Connie Sachs are retired and most of the older generation of Circus personnel are moved on. In the aftermath of the debacle, Peter Guillam contemplates the possibility that Smiley allowed the CIA to gain the upper hand so as to have himself removed as head of the Circus.

Characters
The Circus
 The Hon. Jerry Westerby — a reporter and retired secret agent
 George Smiley — (temporary) chief of the Circus
 Peter Guillam — Circus "cup-bearer" to Smiley
 Fawn – Hardman Scalphunter, later Smiley's minder
 Connie Sachs — chief Moscow-gazer
 Doc di Salis — head China-watcher
 Molly Meakin — skilful, junior staff; a pretty Circus girl who catches Peter Guillam's eye
 Sam Collins — an "old Circus" field officer, formerly based in Vientiane, Laos. Codename: "Mellon"
 Stubbs — Westerby's managing editor at the newspaper

The Steering Committee (authorising further operations after the Ko bank account papers are obtained)
 Oliver Lacon — Circus watchdog from the Cabinet Office
 Roddy Martindale — of the Foreign Office, a gossiping poseur
 Saul Enderby — of the Foreign Office, was ambassador to Indonesia; the chief pundit on South East Asia; future chief of the Circus
 Wilbraham — of the Colonial Office
 Pretorius — of the Security Service
 The Welsh Hammer — a Treasury banker

Other characters
 Ann — Smiley's unfaithful wife
 Peter Worthington — the husband Elizabeth Worthington abandoned
 Mr. and Mrs. Pelling – Elizabeth Worthington's parents
 Mrs. Matthews – unofficial widow of Control
 Mr. Hibbert – as a missionary in Shanghai, knew Drake Ko and his brother Nelson
 Martello – CIA chief of London station (COS London)
 Murphy – Martello's assistant
 Tiny Ricardo – Mexican frontman for Indocharter Vientiane S.A.
 Elizabeth Worthington, alias Lizzie, alias Lizzie Ricardo, alias Liese Worth – first, common-law wife of Tiny Ricardo; then, mistress of Drake Ko
 Charlie Marshall – sometime business partner of Tiny Ricardo
 Luke – Californian journalist in Hong Kong
 Big Moo – local journalistic jargon for the governor of Hong Kong
 Rockhurst ("The Rocker") – Superintendent of Police in Hong Kong
 William Craw – an ageing journalist, working for the Circus, character based on Richard Hughes
 Jake Chiu – Luke's landlord, a real-estate entrepreneur
 Major Tufty Thesinger – Erstwhile SIS Head of Station, Hong Kong
 Frost – works at a Hong Kong bank, is used by Westerby
 Drake Ko – Hong Kong Fat Cat, receiving US$25K a month from the Soviets
 Nelson Ko – Drake's brother; also the name of Drake's deceased son
 Tiu – Ko's assistant
 Arpego – wealthy Filipino, friend of Ko
 Phoebe Wayfarer – half-English, half-Chinese agent for Brit Intel
 Sally Cale – art faker, illicit bullion dealer, occasional heroin trafficker, business partner or employee of Ko, introduced Liese to him
 Max Keller – veteran journalist whom Westerby meets in Phnom Penh
 Lorraine – American journalist in Phnom Penh

Adaptations
Jonathan Powell, producer of Tinker, Tailor, Soldier, Spy (1979), said the BBC considered producing The Honourable Schoolboy but a production in Southeast Asia was considered prohibitively expensive and therefore the BBC instead adapted the third novel of the Karla Trilogy, Smiley's People (1979), which was transmitted in 1982.

In 1983 the BBC adapted The Honourable Schoolboy to radio; Martin Jarvis played Jerry Westerby and Peter Vaughan played George Smiley. A subsequent BBC radio adaptation, first broadcast in 2010 in the Classic Serial slot, featured Simon Russell Beale as George Smiley and Hugh Bonneville as Jerry Westerby, as part of Radio 4's year-long project to adapt all eight Smiley novels.

References

Novels by John le Carré
1977 British novels
Cold War spy novels
Hong Kong
Hodder & Stoughton books
British spy novels
Novels set in Cambodia
Novels set in London
Novels set in Thailand
Novels adapted into radio programs